According to the legendary Poésies de Clotilde, Barbe de Verrue was French trouvère in the 13th century. She was said to be an adopted child, and a successful singer who traveled and performed her own songs. She performed songs about Griseldis, a poem titled Gallic Orpheus about the Gauls, and another titled Aucassin and Nicolette. Her work was described as "lively" and "gay", and not necessarily romantic. She is memorialized as a figure in The Dinner Party by Judy Chicago.

References

Fictional poets